Unorthodox is a German drama television miniseries that debuted on Netflix on March 26, 2020. The first Netflix series to be primarily in Yiddish, it is inspired by Deborah Feldman's 2012 autobiography, Unorthodox: The Scandalous Rejection of My Hasidic Roots. The four-part miniseries was created and written by Anna Winger and Alexa Karolinski, and directed by Maria Schrader.

The series received eight Primetime Emmy Award nominations, including Outstanding Limited Series, Outstanding Lead Actress in a Limited Series (Shira Haas), and Outstanding Writing for a Limited Series (Anna Winger), winning for Outstanding Directing for a Limited Series (Maria Schrader).

Premise
Esty Shapiro, a 19-year-old Jewish woman, is living unhappily in an arranged marriage among the Satmar sect of the ultra-Orthodox community in Williamsburg, Brooklyn, New York City. She runs away to Berlin, where her estranged mother lives, and tries to navigate a secular life, discovering life outside her community and rejecting all of the beliefs she grew up with. Her husband, who learns that she is pregnant, travels to Berlin with his cousin, by order of their rabbi, to try to find her.

Cast and characters

Main
 Shira Haas as Esther "Esty" Shapiro
 Amit Rahav as Yakov "Yanky" Shapiro
 Jeff Wilbusch as Moishe Lefkovitch

Recurring

Episodes

Production 
The series was inspired by, and is loosely based on, the memoir Unorthodox: The Scandalous Rejection of My Hasidic Roots  by Deborah Feldman, who left the Satmar movement, a Hasidic community in New York City. The show has language switching from English to Yiddish to German. The show was written by Anna Winger and Alexa Karolinski, directed by Maria Schrader, produced by Karolinski, and filmed in Berlin. The music academy in Unorthodox is based on the Barenboim-Said Akademie. Anna Winger told The Guardian: "There's a real music academy called the Barenboim-Said Akademie where Jews and Muslims play classical music together, like a whole utopia. We were inspired by this idea, as the sort of institution that could only begin in Berlin."

Unorthodox is the first Netflix series to be primarily in Yiddish.

Feldman approached writers Winger and Karolinski to turn her autobiography into a television series. They took on the project in part because the story meshed with several topics of mutual interest, especially the challenges of being Jewish in Germany. Winger said that the story "has a kind of doubling back on history", portraying a Jewish character who escapes the "confines of her own life" by returning "to the source of her community's trauma". Because Feldman is a public figure, the writers veered from her life in the fictional Berlin sequences, but based the flashbacks on the book.

An early hire was actor and Yiddish specialist Lili Rosen, who translated the scripts, coached the actors, helped with cultural details, and played the rabbi.  The production team took two research trips to the Brooklyn neighborhood of Williamsburg, touring buildings and meeting with the community of Satmar Jews, where part of the story is set. Cast in Germany, Jeff Wilbusch was unique among the four lead actors in being a native Yiddish speaker from the Satmar community (via the Mea Shearim neighborhood of Jerusalem).

Filming began in New York, then relocated to Berlin, where the production designer built interior sets at CCC Filmstudios that synced with the Brooklyn exteriors. Berlin locations include Potsdamer Platz, which served as the set for the music academy and surroundings, and the Wannsee lake (Großer Wannsee), where, as referenced in the story, the "Final Solution" was planned at a shoreline villa.

For the production and costume designers, the project presented the challenge of creating a period film set in the present day, with the main character gradually transitioning between them. The two-day filming of the wedding was a complex undertaking, involving about a hundred extras that had to accurately depict a nuanced cultural celebration. "The joke on the show was that the men required way more hair and make-up than the women", Winger said. Costume designer Justine Seymour obtained some of the clothes in Williamsburg, but not the costly fur hats, shtreimels, which were made by a Hamburg-based theater company, using fake fur, instead of minks.

Reception

Critical response
Unorthodox received widespread critical acclaim. The review aggregation website Rotten Tomatoes reported an approval rating of 96%, based on 52 reviews, with an average rating of 8.2/10. The website's critical consensus reads: "Unorthodox adapts its source material with extreme care, crafting a series that is at once intimate and urgent, all centered around Shira Haas' captivating performance." On Metacritic, it has a weighted average score of 85 out of 100, based on 11 critics, indicating "universal acclaim".

The miniseries has also been criticized for badly portraying the Hasidic community by Leah Aharoni, who said that the show's depiction of Orthodox / Haredi / Hasidic Jews resembled that of "primitive tribes", and by Julie Joanes, who wrote that spiritual practices depicted in the show were taken out of context.

Accolades

Making Unorthodox documentary
Netflix released a 20-minute documentary, Making Unorthodox, that chronicles the creative process and filming of the miniseries, and discussed the differences between the book and the TV show.

See also

 Shtisel (2013-2021 TV series)
 Menashe (2017 film)
 One of Us (2017 film)
 Leaving the Fold (2008 documentary film)
 Let There Be Light (2007 film)

References

External links

2020 German television series debuts
2020s German television series
2020 German television series endings
2020s German drama television series
Anti-Orthodox Judaism sentiment
English-language television shows
Films about Orthodox and Hasidic Jews
German-language Netflix original programming
German television miniseries
Hasidic Judaism in popular culture
Jews and Judaism in Berlin
Jews and Judaism in Brooklyn
Religious drama television series
Television series about Jews and Judaism
Television shows based on books
Television shows set in Berlin
Television shows set in New York City
Yiddish culture in Germany
Yiddish-language mass media in the United States